Jordan Pereira (born 21 July 1998) is a Uruguayan-born Canadian male volleyball player. He was a member of the Canada men's junior national volleyball team at the 2016 Men's Junior NORCECA Volleyball Championship.

Sporting achievements

Individual awards
 2016 Junior NORCECA Championship - Best Receiver
 2016 Junior NORCECA Championship - Best Digger
 2016 Junior NORCECA Championship - Best Libero
 2017 U-21 Pan-American Cup - Best Receiver

References

1997 births
Living people
Canadian men's volleyball players